Richard H. Scheller (born 30 October 1953) is the former Chief Science Officer and Head of Therapeutics at 23andMe and the former Executive Vice President of Research and Early Development at Genentech. He was a professor at Stanford University from 1982 to 2001 before joining Genentech. He has been awarded the Alan T. Waterman Award in 1989, the W. Alden Spencer Award in 1993 and the NAS Award in Molecular Biology in 1997, won the 2010 Kavli Prize in Neuroscience with Thomas C. Südhof and James E. Rothman, and won the 2013 Albert Lasker Award for Basic Medical Research with Thomas Südhof. He was also given the Life Sciences Distinguished Alumni Award from University of Wisconsin–Madison. He is a Fellow of the American Academy of Arts and Sciences and a Member of the National Academy of Sciences.

Biography
He earned his B.S. in biochemistry from the University of Wisconsin–Madison and his Ph.D. in chemistry from the California Institute of Technology under the guidance of Eric H. Davidson. While a graduate student, he worked with Keiichi Itakura and Arthur Riggs to help synthesize Somatostatin for Herb Boyer at Genentech. After finishing his graduate studies, he did a brief postdoc with Davidson and later with Eric Kandel and Richard Axel at Columbia University. While at Columbia, he extended his previous work with recombinant DNA to identify the egg-laying hormone (ELH) gene family of neuropeptides.

Scheller joined the Stanford University faculty in the Department of Biological Sciences in 1982 and later the Department of Molecular and Cellular Physiology. He was an investigator with the Howard Hughes Medical Institute from 1990 to 2001. While at Stanford, he cloned and identified the proteins that control neurotransmitter release notably those in the Syntaxin family of transport proteins, Rab GTPases, and SNAREs.

In 2001, he was recruited from Stanford to join Genentech as a Senior Vice President and Chief Research Officer replacing Dennis Henner. In 2008, was named the Chief Scientific Officer and Executive Vice President of Research. After the acquisition of Genentech by Hoffmann-La Roche, he was appointed the Head of Genentech Research and Early Development and a member of the enlarged Roche Corporate Executive Committee. He is concurrently an Adjunct Professor in the Department of Biochemistry and Biophysics at the University of California San Francisco.

In March 2015, Scheller joined 23andMe as the Chief Scientific Officer and Head of Therapeutics, creating and leading their Therapeutics team, which translates genetic data into discovery and development of new drug therapies.

Scheller is also known as an expert and enthusiastic collector of traditional and historical African Art, since the 1980s. An article about his passion for African Art appeared in Tribal Arts Magazine and some of his extensive collection was exhibited and published with the 2015 show entitled "Embodiments" at the De Young Museum in San Francisco.

Awards
1989 – Alan T. Waterman Award 
1993 – W. Alden Spencer Award
1997 – NAS Award in Molecular Biology
Life Sciences Distinguished Alumni Award from University of Wisconsin-Madison
2010 – Kavli Prize in Neuroscience 
2013 – Albert Lasker Award for Basic Medical Research 
2014 – Distinguished Alumni Award from California Institute of Technology 
2015 – National Academies of Science
Fellow of the Norwegian Academy of Science and Letters

Personal life
He is married to Susan McConnell, a Professor in the Department of Biology at Stanford University and lives on Stanford Campus.

References

External links 
23andMe Bio
Roche Bio
Genentech Bio
Kavli Prize Bio
Interview from Bancroft Library

1953 births
Living people
American neuroscientists
Howard Hughes Medical Investigators
Genentech people
Members of the United States National Academy of Sciences
 University of Wisconsin–Madison College of Letters and Science alumni
California Institute of Technology alumni
Scientists from Milwaukee
University of California, San Francisco faculty
Stanford University Department of Biology faculty
Stanford University School of Medicine faculty
Recipients of the Albert Lasker Award for Basic Medical Research
Members of the Norwegian Academy of Science and Letters
Kavli Prize laureates in Neuroscience